Melville Point is a point marking the east side of the entrance to Siniff Bay on the coast of Marie Byrd Land, Antarctica. It was mapped by United States Geological Survey from surveys and U.S. Navy air photos, 1959–65, and was named by the Advisory Committee on Antarctic Names for Captain Frederick C. Melville, master of the barquentine City of New York in voyages to the Bay of Whales during the Byrd Antarctic Expedition, 1928–30.

References

Headlands of Marie Byrd Land